William John Annan (born 5 September 1996) is a Scottish professional footballer who plays for North Ferriby as a midfielder.

Club career 

Annan joined Hull City at the age of twelve and signed professionally in 2015. On 22 August 2017, he made his debut in a 2–0 EFL Cup defeat to Doncaster Rovers. After three years at Hull Annan was released before subsequently signing for Northern Premier League Premier Division side Scarborough Athletic. In February 2020, Annan signed for North Ferriby.

International career 
On 12 August 2014, Annan made his international debut for Scotland Under-19s. He made a 20-minute appearance from the bench in a 2–0 defeat to Belgium Under-19s.

Statistics

References 

1996 births
Living people
Scottish footballers
Association football midfielders
Hull City A.F.C. players
Sportspeople from Beverley